Houghton Saint Giles is a village and former civil parish, now in the parish of Barsham, in the North Norfolk district, in the English county of Norfolk. In 1931 the parish had a population of 142.

The villages name means 'hill-spur farm/settlement'.

The village is one of four settlements that are within the parish of Barsham; the other villages are West Barsham, East Barsham and North Barsham. Originally all four villages had their own parishes, but these were merged to create a single civil parish on 1 April 1935.

Houghton Saint Giles is 4.2 miles north of the town of Fakenham, 21.2 miles west of Cromer and 118 miles north of London. The nearest railway station is at Sheringham for the Bittern Line. The nearest airport is Norwich International Airport. A regular bus service is provided as Houghton is on the Coastliner bus route (service number 36) with destinations including Fakenham, Wells-next-the-Sea, Hunstanton and King's Lynn.

In the parish is the Basilica of Our Lady of Walsingham, also known as the Slipper Chapel. Built in 1340, it was the last chapel on the pilgrim route to Walsingham.

Parish church
The Church of England parish church of Saint Giles was largely rebuilt by William Eden Nesfield in 1877 and much of the building materials for the new church were reused from an older church on the site. At the western end of the church there is a low tower with a pyramid cap. The nave and the chancel are under one tiled roof. The church is a Grade I listed building.

References

http://kepn.nottingham.ac.uk/map/place/Norfolk/Houghton%20St%20Giles

Villages in Norfolk
North Norfolk